Francis Henri Bélanger (born January 15, 1978) is a Canadian former professional ice hockey player. He played 10 games in the National Hockey League (NHL) with the Montreal Canadiens during the 2000–01 season.

Career statistics

Regular season and playoffs

External links

References 

1978 births
Canadian ice hockey left wingers
Charlotte Checkers (1993–2010) players
Cincinnati Mighty Ducks players
Danbury Trashers players
Hull Olympiques players
Living people
Montreal Canadiens players
Philadelphia Flyers draft picks
Philadelphia Phantoms players
Quebec Citadelles players
Richmond RiverDogs players
Rimouski Océanic players
Trenton Titans players